is the second studio album by Japanese idol duo Wink, released by Polystar on June 30, 1989. It features the No. 1 single "Namida wo Misenai de (Boys Don't Cry)", a Japanese-language cover of Moulin Rouge's "Boys Don't Cry". Also included in the album are covers of Kylie Minogue and Jason Donovan's "Especially for You", Holly Knight's "Baby Me", Blondie's "Heart of Glass", The Dooleys' "Body Language", Annica Burman's "För Fulla Segel", Connie Francis' "I'm Gonna Be Warm This Winter", Debbie Harry's "You Got Me in Trouble", and The Nolans' "Let's Make Love".

The album hit No. 1 on Oricon's albums chart and sold over 508,000 copies. It was also certified Platinum by the RIAJ.

Track listing 
All lyrics are written by Neko Oikawa, except where indicated; all music is arranged by Motoki Funayama, except where indicated.

Charts

Certification

Footnotes

References

External links 
 
 
 

1989 albums
Wink (duo) albums
Japanese-language albums